Manikganj Government High School is a secondary school in Manikganj District, Bangladesh. It provides schooling from class 6 to SSC. This school started operating from 1884. EIIN - 110957 and School Code: 4014.

Bangladesh period 
After the formation of Bangladesh it got some changes in education. The school is now providing education from grade six to grade 10 (locally called class six to class ten) and then the students who pass the 10th grade, attend for a public examination named Secondary School Certificate examination, by which the students get a secondary school certificate to get admission in any college for higher secondary certificate.

Notable alumni
 Bulbul Chowdhury, dancer and writer
 Mohammad Kaykobad

References

External links
 Ministry of Education
 Secondary Education Board

Educational institutions established in 1884
High schools in Bangladesh
1884 establishments in British India